Captain Moonlight may refer to:
Captain Moonlite, an Irish-born Australian bushranger
A nickname for agrarian violence in Ireland; see Whiteboys